The Love County Jail and Sheriff's Residence, at 408 W. Chickasaw in Marietta, Oklahoma, was built in 1910.  It was listed on the National Register of Historic Places in 2007.

It is a cruciform plan building which had jail cells for inmates on the second floor and a residence for the sheriff on the first floor.

References

National Register of Historic Places in Love County, Oklahoma
Houses completed in 1910
Government buildings completed in 1910
Houses on the National Register of Historic Places in Oklahoma
Jails on the National Register of Historic Places in Oklahoma